Johann Sebastian Bach composed suites, partitas and overtures in the baroque dance suite format for solo instruments such as harpsichord, lute, violin, cello and flute, and for orchestra.

Harpsichord
 English Suites, BWV 806–811
 French Suites, BWV 812–817
 Partitas for keyboard, BWV 825–830
 Overture in the French style, BWV 831
 Other:
 Miscellaneous suites, BWV 818–824
 Miscellaneous suites and suite movements, BWV 832–845

Lute

 Lute Suite in G minor, BWV 995
 Lute Suite in E minor, BWV 996
 Lute Suite in C minor, BWV 997
 Prelude, Fugue and Allegro in E-flat major, BWV 998

Violin

From Sonatas and Partitas for Solo Violin, BWV 1001–1006:
 Partita for Violin No. 1, BWV 1002
 Partita for Violin No. 2, BWV 1004
 Partita for Violin No. 3, BWV 1006

Cello
 Cello Suites, BWV 1007–1012

Flute
 Partita in A minor for solo flute, BWV 1013

Orchestral suites
 Orchestral suites, BWV 1066–1069, also called overtures
 Orchestral Suite in G minor, BWV 1070 (doubtful)

See also
 List of compositions by Johann Sebastian Bach

 
Lists of compositions by Johann Sebastian Bach
Former disambiguation pages converted to set index articles